Arina Andreyevna Ushakova (born 18 December 1989) is a Russian pair skating coach and former competitor. With Sergei Karev, she is the 2005 Golden Spin of Zagreb silver medalist and 2007 Winter Universiade bronze medalist. They placed 5th at the 2008 European Championships.

Personal life 
Ushakova was born 18 December 1989 in Perm. She is married to former pair skater Vladislav Zhovnirski, with whom she has a child (born  2016).

Career 
Ushakova teamed up with Alexander Popov in 2000. After training under Liudmila Kalinina, they moved to the husband-and-wife team of Valentina and Valeri Tiukov, who coached them in Perm. Ushakova/Popov won four medals on the JGP series – one gold, two silver, and one bronze – and qualified twice for the JGP Final. Their partnership ended in 2005.

Ushakova teamed up with Sergei Karev in 2005, moving from Perm to Moscow in order to train with him. Originally coached by Nina Mozer, the pair switched to Natalia Pavlova ahead of the 2007–08 season. Ushakova/Karev won the bronze medal at the 2008 Russian Nationals and were sent to the 2008 European Championships where they finished 5th. In the long program, they had a fall on a lift but were not injured. They split at the end of the season due to Karev's serious illness. After a tryout with Jerome Blanchard, she decided to retire from competition.

Ushakova works as a coach in Moscow. She has coached Arina Cherniavskaia / Antonio Souza-Kordeyru and Albina Sokur / Roman Pleshkov.

Programs

With Karev

With Popov

Results 
JGP: Junior Grand Prix

With Karev

With Popov

References

External links
 
 
 Tracings.net profile

1989 births
Figure skating coaches
Sportspeople from Perm, Russia
Living people
Russian female pair skaters
Figure skaters at the 2007 Winter Universiade
Medalists at the 2007 Winter Universiade
Universiade medalists in figure skating
Universiade bronze medalists for Russia